Giants is an anthology of themed fantasy and science fiction short stories on the subject of giants edited by Isaac Asimov, Martin H. Greenberg and Charles G. Waugh as the fifth volume in their Isaac Asimov's Magical Worlds of Fantasy series. It was first published in paperback by Signet/New American Library in November 1985. The first British edition was issued in trade paperback by Robinson in July 1987.

The book collects twelve novellas, novelettes and short stories by various fantasy and science fiction authors, with an introduction by Asimov.

Contents
"Introduction: Giants in the Earth" (Isaac Asimov)
"The Riddle of Ragnarok" (Theodore Sturgeon)
"Straggler from Atlantis" (Manly Wade Wellman)
"He Who Shrank" (Henry Hasse)
"From the Dark Waters" (David Drake)
"Small Lords" (Frederik Pohl)
"The Mad Planet" (Murray Leinster)
"Dreamworld" (Isaac Asimov)
"The Thirty and One" (David H. Keller, M.D.)
"The Law-Twister Shorty" (Gordon R. Dickson)
"In the Lower Passage" (Harle Oren Cummins)
"Cabin Boy" (Damon Knight)
"The Colossus of Ylourgne" (Clark Ashton Smith)

References

1985 anthologies
Fantasy anthologies
Science fiction anthologies
Martin H. Greenberg anthologies
Signet Books books